The  was held on 2 February 2020 at Yokohama, Kanagawa, Japan. The awards ceremony was held in the city's , the results having been announced on 30 November 2019.

Awards
 Best Film: - It Feels So Good 
 Best Director: 
  - Listen to the Universe
 Rikiya Imaizumi - Just Only Love and Little Nights, Little Love
 Yoshimitsu Morita Memorial Best New Director:  - 
 Best Screenplay: Junji Sakamoto - 
 Best Cinematographer:  -  and 
 Best Actor: Sosuke Ikematsu - 
 Best Actress:
 Mugi Kadowaki - 
 Nana Komatsu - 
 Best Supporting Actor: Ryo Narita - Just Only Love and 
 Best Supporting Actress: Chizuru Ikewaki - 
 Best Newcomer:
  - It Feels So Good
  - Listen to the Universe
  - 
 Anna Yamada - 
 Special Grand Prize: Haruhiko Arai

Top 10
 It Feels So Good'''
 Listen to the Universe Just Only Love   The Journalist   A Girl Missing runner-up. ''

References

Yokohama Film Festival
Yokohama Film Festival
2020 in Japanese cinema
2019 film awards